A'ja Riyadh Wilson (born August 8, 1996) is an American professional basketball player for the Las Vegas Aces of the Women's National Basketball Association (WNBA). Wilson played for the South Carolina Gamecocks in college, and helped lead the Gamecocks to their first NCAA Women's Basketball Championship in 2017, and won the NCAA basketball tournament Most Outstanding Player award. In 2018, she won a record third straight SEC Player of the Year award, leading South Carolina to a record fourth straight SEC Tournament Championship, becoming the all-time leading scorer in South Carolina women's basketball history, and was a consensus first-team All-American for the third consecutive season. Wilson swept all National Player of the Year awards (Wade, AP, Honda, USBWA, Wooden, and Naismith) as the best player in Women's College basketball for 2018. In the 2018 WNBA draft, she was drafted first overall by the Aces. 

Wilson won her first WNBA MVP in 2020, as well as her first Olympic Gold medal in the 2020 Summer Olympics. In 2022, Wilson helped lead the Aces to their first title in franchise history.

Personal life
Wilson was born to Roscoe Jr. and Eva Wilson. She said on NPR's Wait Wait... Don't Tell Me! that she was named for her father's favorite song, "Aja" by Steely Dan. Her middle name Riyadh came from the Saudi Arabian capital where Aja's maternal aunt was deployed in Operation Desert Storm. Her mother had a court stenographer business while her father played basketball professionally in Europe for 10 seasons. Her older brother Roscoe also played professional basketball overseas. Wilson spent her grade school and high school years as one of the few black students in Heathwood Hall Episcopal School, a southern Columbia private school.

Wilson is a Christian. She grew up in a Christian family and her grandfather was a minister.

After graduating from high school in 2014, she attended the University of South Carolina, majoring in Mass Communications. She represented the Gamecocks as a forward in basketball. She completed her Senior year at South Carolina. Wilson is a member of Alpha Kappa Alpha sorority.

In 2019, Wilson played for the "Home" roster during the NBA All-Star Celebrity Game at the Bojangles Coliseum in Charlotte, North Carolina. The roster was made up of celebrities with Carolina roots.

Wilson started Burnt Wax Candle Company and established the A'ja Wilson Foundation that advocates for preventing bullying and education around dyslexia. She is part of the WNBA's social justice council and hosts a podcast with Minnesota Lynx forward Napheesa Collier. Wilson counts Nike and Mountain Dew as sponsors and was named to Forbes' 2021 30 Under 30 list.

High school

Wilson played a total of 119 games after making the varsity as an eighth-grader. She averaged 24.7 points, 13.9 rebounds, and 4.3 blocks a game throughout her high school career. She was number 22 and played as a forward. After finishing as a runner-up in her junior year, Wilson led Heathwood Hall to the 2014 state championship as a senior. Her 35 points, 15 rebounds, and five blocks per game as a senior made her the National High School player of the year in 2014, was a Parade and McDonald's All-American, and was the #1 rated ESPN HoopGurlz prospect in 2014. Wilson committed to play for Dawn Staley at the University of South Carolina.

College career

Wilson played in 37 games her freshman year, leading to four single-game freshman records in the SEC and three single-season freshman records in the SEC, and won the SEC Freshman of the year award. In 2016 as a sophomore, Wilson would win her first SEC Player of the year award and was a consensus All-American, Wilson led the Gamecocks to a SEC regular season and Tournament Championship. In 2017, Wilson once again led the Gamecocks to a SEC regular season and Tournament championship, and went on to win the school's first National Championship with a stirring victory over the Mississippi State Bulldogs in the championship game. She was named the Most Outstanding Player of the tournament. In 2018, Wilson had her best season statistically, and won all of the National player of the year awards. She won a record 3rd straight SEC Player of the Year award, and was also a Consensus All-American for the third straight year. Wilson finished her college career at South Carolina as the all-time leading scorer for the school.

On January 18, 2021, as part of the university's observance of Martin Luther King Day, a statue of Wilson was dedicated near the main entrance to Carolina's basketball home of Colonial Life Arena. In a Zoom call during the ceremony, Wilson noted:

Professional career

WNBA
In 2018, Wilson was drafted first overall by the Las Vegas Aces. On May 20, 2018, in her career debut, Wilson scored 14 points along with 10 rebounds in a 101–65 loss to the Connecticut Sun. On June 12, 2018, Wilson scored a career-high of 35 points along with 13 rebounds in a 101–92 overtime victory against the Indiana Fever, becoming the second rookie in league history to score 35 points and grab 10 rebounds. Wilson would be voted into the 2018 WNBA All-Star Game. Later on in the season, Wilson would be named the WNBA Rookie of the Year. She was tied for third in scoring. Her season performance almost led the Aces to the playoffs as they finished 9th place with a 14–20 record.

On June 29, 2019, Wilson scored a new career-high 39 points in a 102–97 overtime victory against the Indiana Fever. In July, Wilson suffered an ankle injury that kept her out for 4 weeks, causing her to miss the 2019 WNBA All-Star Game. She made her return in mid-August. By the end of the season, the Aces finished with a 21–13 record and the number 4 seed, receiving a bye to the second round, helping the franchise get back to the playoffs for the first time since 2014. In the second round elimination game, the Aces defeated the Chicago Sky 93–92 in a thriller game, where teammate Dearica Hamby came up with a steal and nailed the game-winning three from half-court with 4-second left. However, in the semi-finals, the Aces would lose in four games to the Washington Mystics, who would go on to win the 2019 WNBA championship.

In the 2020 season, the Aces were championship contenders. The season was delayed and shortened to 22 games in a bubble at IMG Academy due to the COVID-19 pandemic. With her all-star teammate Liz Cambage sitting out the season due to health concerns, Wilson carried the team by putting up peak numbers, the Aces finishing the season 18-4 and the number 1 seed, receiving a double bye to the semi-finals. In the semi-finals, the Aces would defeat the Connecticut Sun in a hard-fought five-game series, advancing to the Finals for the second time in franchise history (first since relocating to Las Vegas); however with a shorthanded roster against a fully loaded Seattle Storm team, the Aces would be defeated in a three-game sweep. Wilson would end up winning the MVP award for the 2020 season. 

In 2022, Wilson would win her second MVP and first Defensive Player of the Year award, averaging 19.5 points, 9.4 rebounds and 1.9 blocks while leading the league with 17 double-doubles. Wilson helped propel the Aces to their second finals appearance in three seasons, where they would defeat the Connecticut Sun in four games, giving Wilson her first championship.

Overseas
In August 2018, Wilson signed with the Shaanxi Red Wolves of the Women's Chinese Basketball Association for the 2018–19 off-season.

Career statistics

WNBA

Regular season

|-
| style="text-align:left;"| 2018
| style="text-align:left;"| Las Vegas
| 33 || 33 || 30.6 || .462 || .000 || .774 || 8.0 || 2.2 || 0.8 || 1.6 || 1.4 || 20.7
|-
| style="text-align:left;"| 2019
| style="text-align:left;"| Las Vegas
| 26 || 25 || 28.4 || .479 || .000 || .792 || 6.4 || 1.8 || 0.5 || 1.7 || 2.1 || 16.5
|-
| style="text-align:left;"| 2020
| style="text-align:left;"| Las Vegas
| 22 || 22 || 31.7 || .480 || .000 || .781 || 8.5 || 2.0 || 1.2 || style="background:#d3d3d3;"|2.0° || 1.6 || 20.5
|-
| style="text-align:left;"| 2021
| style="text-align:left;"| Las Vegas
| 32 || 32 || 31.9 || .444 || 1.000 || .876 || 9.3 || 3.1 || 0.9 || 1.3 || 1.4 || 18.3
|-
| style='text-align:left;background:#afe6ba;'|2022†
| style="text-align:left;"| Las Vegas
| 36 || 36 || 30.0 || .501 || .373 || .813 || 9.4 || 2.1 || 1.4 || style="background:#d3d3d3;"|1.9° || 1.7 || 19.5
|-
| style="text-align:left;"| Career
| style="text-align:left;"| 5 years, 1 team
| 149 || 148 || 30.5 || .473 || .376 || .807 || 8.4 || 2.3 || 1.0 || 1.7 || 1.6 || 19.1

Playoffs

|-
| style="text-align:left;"| 2019
| style="text-align:left;"| Las Vegas
| 5 || 5 || 33.7 || .436 || .000 || .950 || 7.8 || 1.6 || 0.6 || style="background:#d3d3d3;"|2.0° || 1.6 || 13.4
|-
| style="text-align:left;"| 2020
| style="text-align:left;"| Las Vegas
| 8 || 8 || 35.4 || .473 || .000 || .857 || 8.9 || 2.4 || 1.0 || 2.3 || 2.0 || 20.8
|-
| style="text-align:left;"| 2021
| style="text-align:left;"| Las Vegas
| 5 || 5 || 32.2 || .435 || .000 || .654 || 9.2 || 3.2 || 1.0 || 1.0 || 2.2 || 14.2
|-
| style='text-align:left;background:#afe6ba;' |2022†
| style="text-align:left;"| Las Vegas
| 10 || 10 || 37.2 || .552 || .143 || .791 || 10.4 || 2.0 || 1.0 || 2.4 || 1.3 || 20.3
|-
| style="text-align:left;"| Career
| style="text-align:left;"| 4 years, 1 team
| 28 || 28 || 35.1 || .490 || .143 || .809 || 9.3 || 2.3 || 0.9 || 2.0 || 1.7 || 18.1

College

Source: College statistics courtesy of NCAA Statistics

Awards and honors

WNBA
WNBA Champion (2022)
4× WNBA All-Star (2018–2020, 2022)
WNBA Rookie of the Year (2018)
WNBA Most Valuable Player (2020, 2022)
WNBA Defensive Player of the Year (2022)

College
NCAA Tournament Most Outstanding Player (2017)
Wade Trophy (2018)
John R. Wooden Award (2018)
Honda Sports Award (2018)
Naismith College Player of the Year (2018)
AP Player of the Year (2018)
USBWA Player of the Year (2018)
   Lisa Leslie Award (2018) 
3× Consensus first-team All-American (2016–2018)
3× SEC Player of the Year (2016–2018)
2x SEC Defensive Player of the Year   (2016, 2018)
4× First-team All-SEC (2015–2018)
SEC Freshman of the Year (2015)
SEC All-Freshman Team (2015)

High school
National High School Player of the Year (WBCA, Naismith, Parade) (2014)
McDonald's All-America (2013–14)
Parade All-America (2013–14)
Gatorade South Carolina Girls Basketball Player of the Year (2013–2014)

References

External links
 
 
 
 

1996 births
Living people
All-American college women's basketball players
American expatriate basketball people in China
American women's basketball players
Basketball players at the 2020 Summer Olympics
Basketball players from South Carolina
Las Vegas Aces draft picks
Las Vegas Aces players
McDonald's High School All-Americans
Medalists at the 2020 Summer Olympics
Olympic gold medalists for the United States in basketball
Parade High School All-Americans (girls' basketball)
People from Hopkins, South Carolina
Power forwards (basketball)
South Carolina Gamecocks women's basketball players
Women's National Basketball Association first-overall draft picks
21st-century American women
United States women's national basketball team players
Women's National Basketball Association All-Stars